WASP-41 is a G-type main-sequence star. Its surface temperature is 5450 K. WASP-41 is similar to the Sun in its concentration of heavy elements, with a metallicity Fe/H index of −0.080, but is much younger at an age of 2.289 billion years. The star does exhibit strong starspot activity, with spots covering 3% of the stellar surface.

Multiplicity surveys did not detect any stellar companions as of 2017.

Planetary system
In 2012, one planet, named WASP-41b, was discovered on a tight, circular orbit. The transmission spectrum taken in 2017 was gray and featureless. No atmospheric constituents could be distinguished. The planetary orbit of WASP-41b is slightly misaligned with the equatorial plane of the star, at a misalignment angle of 9.15°. Planetary equilibrium temperature is 1242 K.

Another planet, WASP-41c, was discovered in 2015. The planets are too far apart to significantly affect each other's orbits. The planetary equilibrium temperature of WASP-41c is 247 K.

References

Centaurus (constellation)
Planetary transit variables
G-type main-sequence stars
Planetary systems with two confirmed planets
J12422849-3038235
CD-29 98732